Thomas Fitzmaurice or Thomas FitzMaurice may refer to:

 Thomas Fitzmaurice, 16th Baron Kerry (1502–1590), Irish baron
 Thomas Fitzmaurice, 18th Baron Kerry (1574–1630), his grandson, Irish military leader in the Nine Years' War
 Thomas FitzMaurice, 1st Earl of Kerry (1668–1741), his great-grandson, Irish peer and politician
 Thomas Fitzmaurice (MP) (1742–1793), his grandson,  Member of Parliament for Calne, and for Chipping Wycome
 Thomas FitzMaurice, 5th Earl of Orkney (1803–1877), his grandson
 Tom Fitzmaurice (1898–1977), Australian rules footballer